Neoxeniades anchicayensis is a butterfly in the  family Hesperiidae. It is found in Colombia.

References

Butterflies described in 2007
Hesperiinae